Abdelkrim Baadi (born 14 April 1996) is a Moroccan professional footballer who plays as a leftback for RS Berkane and the Morocco national football team.

Club career
Baadi started his career playing for HUSA. In October 2020, he joined RS Berkane.

International career
Baadi made his professional debut for the Morocco national football team in a 0–0 tie with Malawi on 22 March 2019, in a 2019 Africa Cup of Nations qualification match.

References

External links
 
 

1996 births
Living people
People from Agadir
Moroccan footballers
Morocco international footballers
Hassania Agadir players
RS Berkane players
Botola players
Association football fullbacks
2019 Africa Cup of Nations players
2020 African Nations Championship players
Morocco A' international footballers